The 1904 International Lawn Tennis Challenge was the fourth edition of what is now known as the Davis Cup, and the first edition to be played outside American soil. As defending champions, the British Isles team played host to the competition, which featured teams from Belgium and France for the first time. Belgium and France would play for the right to challenge the British Isles for the cup. The ties were played at Worple Road (the former site of the All England Club) in Wimbledon, London, United Kingdom from 27 June to 5 July. Despite Malcolm Whitman giving his word that an American team would enter, the Americans failed to make a challenge before the 7 March deadline.

Final
Belgium vs. France

Challenge Round
British Isles vs. Belgium

References

External links
Davis Cup official website

Davis Cups by year
International Lawn Tennis Challenge
International Lawn Tennis Challenge
1904 in English tennis
1904 sports events in London